Hyposmocoma malornata is a species of moth of the family Cosmopterigidae. It was first described by Lord Walsingham in 1907. It is endemic to the Hawaiian islands of Necker, Nihoa, Kauai, Oahu, Molokai, Maui and Hawaii.

The larva is probably a case-maker, and it may feed on lichen.

External links

malornata
Endemic moths of Hawaii
Moths described in 1907
Taxa named by Thomas de Grey, 6th Baron Walsingham